Director of Operations may refer to:

In business
 Chief operating officer, also called the chief operations officer, director of operations, or operations director
 Operations Director, sometimes defined to have less control than a Chief operating officer

In government
 Director of Floor Operations, the title of two staff members in the United States House of Representatives
 Directorate of Operations (CIA), one of the main components of the US Central Intelligence Agency
 Deputy Director for Operations, a former title of the Director of the National Clandestine Service in the US Central Intelligence Agency

In military organizations
 Director of Operations and Intelligence, a former title of the Deputy Chief of the Air Staff in the Royal Air Force
 Director of Operations, Planning and Development for Military Commissions, the point of contact between the Office of Military Commissions and other United States military and civilian agencies
 Operations Directorate, a branch in the General Staff of the Israel Defense Forces

Military operations
 Operation Director (Battle of Arawe), a battle fought in December 1943 between Allied and Japanese forces during the New Britain Campaign of World War II